Beogradski Sindikat (Serbian Cyrillic: Београдски Синдикат, English: Belgrade Syndicate) is a Serbian hip-hop collective from Belgrade, Serbia. It was formed on March 21, 1999, by uniting two underground hip-hop bands: „Red Zmaja“ (Order of the Dragon) and „TUMZ“ (Tehnika Upravljanja Mikrofonom i Znanjem) together with solo artists MC Flex (Feđa) and Šef Sale. Prota and DJ IRon then joined the group in 2004 and 2006 respectively.

Beogradski Sindikat currently consists of eleven members. They have released three albums, the first one was highly acclaimed and marked the beginning of the second wave of Serbian hip hop. They own their record label, Prohibicija.

After a five-year break, Beogradski Sindikat was back in November 2015 with a new single, "BS Armija". Beogradski Sindikat will be realising new songs in form of "singles" in the future. They will not release anymore songs in form of an "album" for now.

Group members
 Žobla - MC (b. Blažo Vujović)
 Ogi - MC (b. Ognjen Janković)
 Deda - MC, producer (born Marko Đurić)
 Dare - MC (b. Darko Marjanović)
 Škabo - MC, producer (b. Boško Ćirković)
 Đolo Đolo - MC, video director, producer (b. Đorđe Jovanović)
 Dajs - MC (b. Vladimir Ćorluka)
 Feđa - MC, producer (b. Feđa Dimović)
 Šef Sale - MC, producer (b. Aleksandar Karadžinović)
 IRon - DJ (b. Stefan Novović)
 Prota - DJ, producer (b. Aleksandar Protić)

Discography

Albums
2001: BSSST...Tišinčina
2005: Svi Zajedno
2010: Diskretni Heroji

Singles
2002: Govedina
2006: Oni su
2015: BS Armija
2016: Sistem te laže
2016: Kasno je
2017: Sindikalna priča
2018: Pišam po sirotinji
2018: Dogodine u Prizrenu
2020: Sviće zora
2020: Извини Србијо

Solo albums
2003: Škabo - Sam
2005: PKS (Škabo & Nadica) - PVO
2007: Šef Sale - Prvi Udar
2008: Škabo - Remek Delo
2009: Škabo - Deset Dina Glasa Na Matrici
2010: Škabo - Muzika za demonstracije
2011: Šef Sale - Ritam mog grada
2011: Škabo - Čovek (EP)
2011: Škabo - Vuk (EP)
2012: Škabo - Beskonačno
2014: Škabo - Priča 2 Vuka
2014: Šef Sale - Život u stihu
2015: Škabo - Toprek X Škabo (EP)
2017: (Škabo & 22obla) - Kalaši + Nive (EP)

Awards and nominations

References

External links

Beogradski sindikat – Balada disidenta (Б. синдикат – Балада дисидента) on YouTube
Beogradski Sindikat on Myspace
Beogradski Sindikat  on VKontakte

1999 establishments in Serbia
Musical groups established in 1999
Serbian hip hop groups
Musical groups from Belgrade
Nationalist musicians